The Old Acropolis Museum ( (Palaio) Mouseio Akropolis) was an archaeological museum located in Athens, Greece on the archeological site of Acropolis.  It is built in a niche at the eastern edge of the rock and most of it lies beneath the level of the hilltop, making it largely invisible.  It was considered one of the major archaeological museums in Athens. Due to its limited size, the Greek government decided in the late 1980s to build a new museum. The New Acropolis Museum is now built at the foot of the Acropolis. In June 2007 the old museum closed its doors so that its antiquities could be moved to their new home, which opened on 20 June 2009.

History

The museum was home to many of the Greek world's ancient relics found in and around the Acropolis of Athens since excavations started.
It was designed by architect Panagis Kalkos and was constructed between 1865 and 1874. It was expanded in the 1950s to a modern design executed by Patroklos Karantinos, a Greek modernist architect.

The Acropolis Museum housed stone sculptures and bronze remains from the monuments of the Acropolis and some artifacts that are excavated on the site. The building is located in the south-east corner of the Acropolis. In 1974 prime minister Konstantinos Karamanlis proposed the construction of a new museum.  Initial plans were made under Melina Mercouri and the ground of the Makrygianni former military hospital and Gendarmerie barracks was chosen. The first competition was criticized and a new competition proclaimed some years later. In 2007 the old building was closed to prepare the move to the new building.

The new building

A new building was designed by Bernard Tschumi and Michali Fotiades, and constructed from 2002 to 2007 on Areopagitou Street. It was inaugurated on Saturday, June 20, 2009, and the entrance fee was 1 euro for the first year, and 5 euros thereafter.

Damage to the Acropolis

Drainage pipes from the Old Acropolis Museum have been attributed for causing much of the decay of the Acropolis.

Collections 

The museum housed artifacts that were found on the site of the Acropolis of Athens. They derive mainly from the Parthenon, the Propylaea, the Erechtheum, the Temple of Athena Nike,  the Eleusinion, the Sanctuary of Artemis Brauronia, the Chalkotheke, the Pandroseion, the Old Temple of Athena, the Odeon of Herodes Atticus, the sanctuary of Asclepius or Asclepieion, the Temple and Theatre of Dionysus Eleutheureus, and the Odeon of Pericles.

Highlights 

 Parthenon Frieze
 Kritios Boy
 Caryatids
 Blond Kouros's Head of the Acropolis
 Moscophoros
 Kouros and Kore
 Nike Adjusting Her Sandal
 Temple of Athena Nike frieze
 Metopes of the Parthenon

See also 
 New Acropolis Museum
 Acropolis
 Erechtheion
 List of museums in Greece
 Perserschutt

Notes

External links 
 Acropolis museum
 Acropolis Museum: Moschophoros, Kritios Boy

Museum
Archaeological museums in Athens
Museums established in 1878
Defunct museums
Ancient Greek culture
Museums disestablished in 2007
2007 disestablishments in Greece
1878 establishments in Greece

de:Akropolismuseum
es:Museo de la Acrópolis
fr:Musée de l'Acropole d'Athènes
it:Museo dell'acropoli di Atene
nl:Acropolis Museum
no:Akropolismuseet
pt:Museu da Acrópole de Atenas
sr:Акропољски музеј
sh:Akropoljski muzej
sv:Akropolismuseet